La Scheulte may refer to

The municipality of Schelten in the canton of Bern, Switzerland.
Scheulte (river) in the canton of Bern.
The Schelten Pass in the Jura Mountains.